The "Practising School, Yangon Institute of Education"(), later, "Practising High School, Yangon University of Education"() (abbreviated TTC Yangon) was the name of a high school in Yangon, Myanmar, which is currently called Basic Education Department Practising High School, Kamayut  Township. Although it is a high school in the technical sense, TTC's student body comprises students from Grade Kg (formerly Kindergarten) to Grade Eleven (formerly Tenth Standard) or Matriculation, the highest standard in the Myanmar education system. The origin of the name of the school comes from the fact that TTC is part of the Institute of Education (former Teachers' Training College), whose trainee teachers are attached to the school as part of their course.

History
The school was established in 1931. Its main campus is situated on Pyay Road in Kamayut Township. It was established as an experimental school by the colonial education authority as a new means to deliver scientific education to the student body. Thus, the school did not fall under either the colonial government's school syllabus (consisting mostly of mission-schools run by the religious order), nor the newly founded Nationalist Vernacular school network. Consequently, after Myanmar (Burma)'s independence, the school remained somewhat independent of the Basic Education High School network, although they shared the same government implemented syllabus.

Until the outbreak of the World War II, the school had boarding facilities, mainly for students from out of town. The school was served by the Rangoon Electric Tramway's University Line along Prome Road (now Pyay Road).

Administration and campus

The Yangon University of Education (Lower Myanmar) independently ran the TTC High School with the joint administration of Higher Education Department, unlike the rest of the schools in the country which are administered by the Basic Education Department. TTC Yangon was therefore the only significant school of considerable size outside the Basic Education School network. But, since 2018, the Department of Higher Education started to transfer all the Practising Schools of Education Colleges and Universities of Education under it. TTC Yangon has been completely transferred in 2021.

TTC has one campus: Pyay Road (in Kamayut Township) campus. TTC Kamayut Campus is different to other schools'campuses for their university-like locations.

Kamayut campus is bordered by three universities: the University of Medicine-1, Yangon, the University of Education, and the University of Distant Education, sharing the same main street, Thaton Street.

Student body
TTC Yangon has a large student body in Yangon and in Myanmar, numbering near 9000.  The students are spread across eleven standards or grades, from Grade-1 (formerly Kindergarten of KG) to Grade-11 (formerly Tenth Standard, colloquially sei-dan)

For many years, TTC students have a tradition of putting the right finger at the lip and say "Kyan Mar Shwin Lan Par Sae" *_ကျန်းမာရွင်လန်းပါစေ ဆရာ/ဆရာမ_* – (good health to you) to the teachers. This is a tradition to show respect to the teachers.

Uniform

Students wear uniform. There are two sets of uniform, one for wear from Kindergarten to 4th Standard (Grades 1 to 5), and another, more traditional one for wear from the 5th Standard to 10th Standard (Grades 6 to 11). All uniforms are of the same colour – a white shirt or blouse, with a green garment for the torso.

School badge
The distinguishing feature of the TTC student's uniform is the lack of the sewn-in school badge – all other schools require that the school name and badge be sewn into either the shoulder sleeve or above the single left side pocket.

In TTC, a small brooch like badge, bearing an oil lamp (in both Buddhist and Burmese terminology, the oil lamp represents wisdom and education), with school's name. TTC Yangon is the only school which has such a badge system.

Boys uniform
 From Kindergarten to the 4th Standard, boys wear a white shirt (with or without the collar), tucked into a green pants – either short or long. Shoes and the traditional slipper, Hnyat-phanat are footwear.
 From the 5th Standard onwards, the students wear a white shirt (with or without the collar), and a green paso. Only the Hnyat-phanat is permitted. Traditional Mandalay slippers, usually of velvet or other materials, are worn.
 Current uniform rules began in late 1977. Boys from Kindergarten through the 7th or 8th Standard wear either green shorts or green longyis until 1977. Before nationwide white and green uniforms were introduced in the mid sixties, the TTC uniform consisted of a white shirt and light green longyi with vertical white stripes.

Girls uniform
 From Kindergarten to the 4th Standard, girls can wear either skirts or pants, with a white shirt. Girls usually wear slippers.
 For 5th Standard onwards, the uniform also becomes more traditional like its male counterpart. The girls wear either a front opening (yin-zee) or side opening (yin-phone) traditional Burmese blouse, with the Htamein as the lower garment.
 Current uniform rules began in late 1977. Girls from Kindergarten through the 7th or 8th Standard wear either green skirts or green Htamein until 1977. Before nationwide white and green uniforms were introduced in mid sixties, TTC uniform was a white shirt and light green Htamein with vertical white stripes.

Accomplishments
It ranks the highest overall in Burmese High School in the Myanmar University Entrance exam, conducted by the Myanma Examination Board. TTC's student body produces many high scoring students both in terms of collective subjects and individual subjects, making into the very competitive "nationwide outstanding top-ten students' list", colloquially known as the whole-Burma or top ten list quite often.

TTC has won medals in national and international competitions, such as South East Asian Games.

Students have won medals in "Myanmar Traditional and Cultural Performing Arts Competition" (So-Ka-Yay-Tee) and won painting
competitions.

Renovations
TTC relied on already existing buildings for much of its existence. Much of these buildings were on loan from the Yangon University of Education. However, by 2000, the grants expired and were not renewed. In order to cope with the loss of nearly three-quarters of its classroom capacity, a building and renovation programme was implemented, resulting in the renting of the former University of Yangon (Hlaing Campus), which was also known as Regional College Number 2 (or RC-2), and the building of a new school wing. Five wings from RC-2 were rented from the Ministry of Education in 2000, and the completion of a three-storey wing.

With the rising use of the internet and government promotion of information technology, two IT labs have been added to the campus facilities, though they are not frequently used, due to the overwhelming student population. A new assembly hall, arts hall and a chemistry lab have also been added.

Facilities
Pyay Campus
The library building was built with funds donated by Daw Mya Nwe.
Football field – the field was the site of a big nationalist vernacular school, which rented the field from 1932–1934. The field also housed refugee huts during the Second World War. The Student Volunteer Army of the Union of Burma, called Thanmani-tut in Burmese (lit. Steel Forces), were trained in the field. Most of the Thanmani-tut were used in the reconquest of the country from rebels and KMT forces.
One canteen – It is opened in 2009. It's a large canteen. The food that the shopkeepers sell are also very healthy.
Anu-pyin-nyar Hall – new assembly hall built in the new school wing, now used for school reunions and functions.
Biology-Chemistry Lab – when the old lab was handed back to the Institute of Education, a new one was built to replace it, in the new school wing. However, equipment and chemicals are extremely hard to replace (high student population, funding issues, lack of teachers) and thus is seldom used.
PT (Physical Training) Hall – an older occupant of the campus, it was renovated in 2004. It also serves as a back-up assembly hall and badminton court.
IT Lab – built in the new school wing under the government's policy to embrace information technology, the IT lab shares the site with the Biology-Chemistry Lab, though it is more frequently used.

Principals (Headmasters/Headmistresses)
??? (1931–1936)
U Ba (1936–1952)
U Kyaw Ngwe (1953–1956)
Daw Aye Tin (1956–1963)
Daw Thein Han (1963–1976)
Daw Tin Tin Aye (1976–1988)
Daw Khin May Yi (1989–1992)
Daw Khin Nwe Tint (1992–1997)
Daw Khin Win Aung (1997–2004)
U Myo Win (2004–2007)
Dr. Nandar Htun (2007–2010)
Dr. Win Min Latt (2010–2011)
Dr. Myint Myint San (2011–2016)
Dr. Moe Thu (2016–2018)
Daw Win Win Nwe (2018–2021)
Dr. Thwe Thwe Oo (2021-Present)

Alumni
Pe Thein (Class of 1941) (deceased) – former Minister for Education and Health (retired 1997) and former lecturer at Universities of Yangon and Mandalay. Awarded PhD from the University of Durham. Awarded the honorary rank of Colonel for his contribution to medical sciences and public health in Myanmar although no military service was performed.
Tun Tun Naung (Class of 1979) – Commander of Yangon Military Region Command and Former Deputy Commandant of the Defence Services Academy
Tay Za (Class of 1981) – owner of Air Bagan and Htoo Group of Companies
Zaw Win Htut (Class of 1981)- singer
Wai Htun (Class of 1981) – drummer
Sao Ohn Hseng (Class of 1996) – National Representative in Asian Games & Southeast Asian Games – Swimmer
Su Myat Soe (Class of 2000) – South East Asian Games Gold Medalist and sailor
Saung Oo Hlaing (1987) – singer
Myo Kyawt Myaing (1987) – singer
Myo Myo and Than Tar Win (son and daughter of Nwe Yin Win) – singers
Alex (1995) – singer
Yadana Khin (Class of 1997) – actress
Kyaw Htut Swe (Class of 2002) – freelance Rapper under the name "VIP" @ "Aw Jaw Lan (AJL)", also known as "Rapper Pauk-sa Kyaw Htut Swe" 
Kyaw Phyo Tun (Class of 2002) – rapper under the name "Ah Boy". Nephew of actor Lwin Moe. 
Moe Aung Yin (Class of 2003) – actor and son of singer Aung Yin
Hein Wai Yan [aka. Thura Ko] (Class of 2005) – model and actor
Kaizar Tin Mong -Frontman and Bassist from Antibiotic (Class of 1997)
Phyu Phyu Kyaw Thein (Class of 1998)
Moe Thu Aung  – swimmer (class of 1997)
Sai Ye Htet Kaung -Music Producer (Class of 2005) 
Paing Phyo Thu - (Class of 2006) - Famous Actress who got art academy award and she stand with Myanmar Citizens which against Military Coup in 2021
Kyaw Ko Ko Wai - (Class of 2006) - Actor, model and presenter, and he stand with Myanmar Citizens which against Military Coup in 2021

References

External links
Pe Thein Retrieved 16 January 2010
Published Works
Staff List
NC

High schools in Yangon
Education in Yangon